Centripetalism, sometimes called integrationism, is a form of democratic power sharing for divided societies (usually along ethnic, religious or social lines) which aims to encourage the parties towards moderate and compromising policies and to reinforce the centre of divided political spectrum. As a theory, centripetalism developed out of the criticism of consociationalism by Donald L.Horowitz. Both models aim to provide institutional prescriptions for divided societies. While consociationalism aims to give inclusion and representation to each ethnic group, centripetalism aims to depoliticize ethnicity and to encourage the establishment of multi-ethnic parties.

Instruments 
Centripetalism is associated with institutions that provide incentives for elite cooperation such as vote pooling. Vote pooling occurs when politicians need to attract voters from the different groups in order to win the elections. For example, if some ethnic group is not large enough to get their own ethnic political representative, voters from that group would prefer to cast their second preference to the moderate politicians of the other ethnicity, rather than to the radical politician of the other ethnicity. In this theoretical model, vote pooling gives advantages to the moderate politicians aiming to attract the votes from the other groups because of the electoral system allowing voters to indicate preferences. This model incentivizes the formation of pre-electoral coalitions across conflict lines. Based on this logic, centripetalists prefer such voting systems as alternative vote, supplementary vote, single transferable vote.

Examples 
Centripetalist institutions and voting systems are quite rare and there are not many examples of their use. The most famous examples come from Fiji (1997-2006), Northern Ireland (June 1973 to May 1974), Papua New Guinea, Sri Lanka, Indonesia, Kenya, and Nigeria.

Criticism 
One of the main problems of the theory is the lack of empirical evidence supporting the effectiveness of centripetalism. Centripetalist institutions do not work in the electoral systems in which electoral districts are homogenous, because in those cases politicians would not have incentives to create multi-ethnic parties as they do not need to appeal to the voters outside of their group. Some evidence suggests that centripetal institutions lead to more instability and extremism 

Strong supporters of consociationalism argue that centripetalism does not provide enough guarantees of representation and argue that what groups want is representation and not an indirect influence of majority decisions. O'Leary also notes that "centripetal vote- pooling institutions unfairly privilege the majority or largest group; politicians from such groups have to pool fewer votes to win office than do politicians from smaller groups.” McGarry also criticises that centripetalism tends to leave hardliners outside of the political system, which polarizes the political environment, making it impossible for moderates in the government to compromise. The moderates thus become more hardline.

Further reading 
Horowitz, Donald L. 1985. Ethnic Groups In Conflict. Berkeley, Calif. u.a.: Univ. of Calif. Press.

Sisk, T.D. (1996) Power-sharing and International Mediation in Ethnic Conflicts (Washington, DC: United States Institute of Peace Press).

References

Centripetalism 

Power sharing
Democracy
Centrism
Electoral system criteria